Patrick Christopher Harlow (born March 16, 1969) is an American retired football (gridiron) player who was an offensive tackle in the National Football League (NFL). His son, Sean Harlow, was also designated as Atlanta Falcons by the fourth round by an NFL draft in 2017.

College career 
Harlow played college football at the University of Southern California and won the Morris Trophy. He blocked for quarterbacks Todd Marinovich and Rodney Peete and cleared the way for Ricky Ervins in college.

Playing career 
He played in the National Football League between 1991 and 1998.

Later years
He became the football head coach at JSerra Catholic High School in San Juan Capistrano, California, in late 2016.

References

1969 births
USC Trojans football players
New England Patriots players
Oakland Raiders players
American football offensive linemen
Living people
Ed Block Courage Award recipients